Gillian Doreen Triggs (born 30 October 1945) is an Australian academic specialising in public international law. In 2019, she was appointed by United Nations Secretary-General António Guterres as Assistant Secretary-General of the United Nations. In this capacity, she will serve as the Assistant High Commissioner for Protection in the team of the United Nations High Commissioner for Refugees Filippo Grandi.

Triggs was President of the Australian Human Rights Commission (HRC) from 2012 to 2017, and is a former Dean of the Sydney Law School, where she was the Challis Professor of International Law between 2007 and 2012. Prior to that she was a professor at the Melbourne Law School. Triggs was also Acting Race Discrimination Commissioner of the HRC from 30 July 2012 to 19 August 2013, and was the Acting Aboriginal and Torres Strait Islander Social Justice Commissioner.

Education
Triggs attended University High School and the University of Melbourne, where she was awarded "Miss University 1966". She earned a Bachelor of Laws in 1967 and a Doctor of Philosophy in 1982. After her admission to the Supreme Court of Victoria as a barrister and solicitor, Triggs worked as a tutor at Monash University.

Triggs also earned a Master of Laws from Southern Methodist University in University Park, Texas, a suburb of Dallas in 1972, while working with the Dallas Police Department, serving as Legal Advisory to the Chief of Police on the Civil Rights Act of 1964.

Career

Academic and other positions 
In 1987, Triggs joined Mallesons Stephen Jaques, where she worked as a consultant on international law.

From 1996 to 2005, Triggs was a full-time Professor at Melbourne Law School. Triggs has published papers on various topics of public international law, including World Trade Organization (WTO) disputes resolution, energy and resources law, law of the sea, territorial sovereignty, jurisdiction and immunity, international criminal law, international environmental law and human rights. Triggs is also the author of two editions of International Law: Contemporary Principles and Practices.

Triggs was also a consultant on international law to the Indonesian law firm Kartini Muljadi and Rekan.

Triggs was the Director of the British Institute of International and Comparative Law from July 2005 to September 2007. Before taking up her appointment, she was the Director of the Institute for Comparative and International Law at the University of Melbourne, where she held a Chair in Law.

Triggs returned to Australia in 2007, to become the Dean of the University of Sydney Law School and Challis Professor of International Law. She took up this role in October 2007.

Triggs was admitted to the Victorian bar, and from 2009 to 2011, she was an honorary member at Sydney barristers' chambers Seven Wentworth Chambers.

Triggs is an Honorary Fellow of the College of Law.

Gillian Triggs was awarded the 2018 Humanist of the Year. Her memoir, Speaking Up, was published by Melbourne University Press in 2018.

Human Rights Commission 

On 27 July 2012, Triggs retired as Dean of the Sydney Law School to take up her appointment as the President of the Australian Human Rights Commission, for a period of five years commencing 30 July 2012. Following the resignation of Helen Szoke, she was Acting Race Discrimination Commissioner from January to August 2013, until Tim Soutphommasane was appointed to the role.

On 3 February 2014, almost two years after her appointment as the President of the Australian Human Rights Commission but only a few months after the election of the Abbott Government, Triggs launched the National Inquiry into Children in Immigration Detention 2014, to "investigate the ways in which life in immigration detention affects the health, well-being and development of children."

Since late in 2014, and following the release of the National Inquiry into Children in Immigration Detention 2014, there was an increase in tensions between the Australian Government under Liberal Prime Minister Tony Abbott and the Office of the President of the Australian Human Rights Commission. Government Ministers subsequently called for Triggs to step down from the presidency of the Australian Human Rights Commission. They alleged that the report was politically motivated and that Triggs' decision not to conduct a review during the term of the previous Labor government was evidence of this.

In October 2016, it was alleged by Liberal Senator Ian MacDonald and others that Triggs had misled the Senate by stating that a journalist had misquoted comments made by Triggs about several Australian politicians. Triggs had been reported in a profile piece by The Saturday Paper as saying: "I knew I could have responded and destroyed them", with reference to a Senate Committee. Triggs asserted that these comments had been added by a "subeditor", however Triggs subsequently said that, "upon further reflection" she accepted that the article was "an accurate excerpt from a longer interview" and that she had "no intention of questioning The Saturday Paper's journalistic integrity."

On 16 November 2016, Prime Minister Malcolm Turnbull said that the Government would not renew Triggs' commission when it expired in 2017.  Her statutory term as President of the HRC expired in July 2017.

In March 2017, Triggs defended her engagement to speak at a fundraising event for the Bob Brown Foundation. Liberal Senator Eric Abetz criticised the appropriateness of Triggs speaking at a fundraiser for the former Greens leader, as the Foundation conducts overtly political activist campaigns. Triggs defended her appearance, stating that event tickets would be used to cover costs, with the surplus being donated to the Bob Brown Foundation. Her appearance resulted in other senior members of government, including Immigration Minister Peter Dutton, calling for her resignation.

Racial Discrimination Act controversy

Triggs received significant criticism for her handling of an action involving three Queensland University of Technology (QUT) students who were accused of racial vilification under Section 18C of the Racial Discrimination Act 1975 (Cth). One of the students was alleged to have breached Section 18C because of a Facebook post which read: "Just got kicked out of the unsigned Indigenous computer room. QUT stopping segregation with segregation." In November 2016, the Federal Court threw out the lawsuit and Judge Michael Jarrett concluded the claim had no reasonable prospects of success.

After this case was dismissed, Prime Minister Malcolm Turnbull called on the Commission to "urgently review" the way it manages race hate cases. Turnbull said that "what the judge was saying to the Human Rights Commission is, 'you've been wasting the court's time. You've been wasting government money'." However, Triggs said she had urged the government to introduce a higher threshold before the commission was obliged to investigate hate speech complaints. She also said "the judge did not make any comment on the Human Rights Commission and made no such extreme, provocative statement." Triggs has also defended the Commission's handling of the case and said the complaint had "a level of substance."

Senator Eric Abetz said that the three students have "had their reputation trashed courtesy of the Human Rights Commission." Tony Morris, the lawyer who represented the students, claimed that Triggs sat on the complaint for 14 months and said she was to blame for the case making it to court. The Human Rights Commission had never contacted the students about the complaint and instead left that task to QUT. Triggs said that 11 months of the delay were due to a request by the complainant and QUT not to notify the students. An article by media outlet The Conversation described the AHRC's conduct in this case as "disgraceful" and questioned why the AHRC did not initially reject the complaints. The article suggested that the decision not to reject the complaints may have given the complainant false hope that the case had merit.

In November 2016, Triggs supported a proposal to change Section 18C. At the time, it was unlawful to "offend, insult, humiliate or intimidate" on the basis of race. Triggs said removing "offend" and "insult" and inserting "vilify" would be a strengthening of the laws. However, in February 2017, Triggs told a Senate committee the AHRC did not see a case to change 18C but recommended reforms requiring that respondents be notified of complaints and allowing the president greater powers to reject complaints. Triggs said “it’s true, the students have suffered from this … but I cannot concede the Commission did anything wrong.”

Personal life
Triggs resides in Sydney, and is married to former Australian diplomat Alan Brown . Triggs was previously married to Melbourne law professor Sandy Clark, with whom she had three children.

Their third child, a daughter named Victoria, was born in 1984, profoundly disabled and with a short life expectancy due to a chromosome abnormality known as Edwards syndrome. When Victoria was 6 months old, Triggs and her former husband placed her in foster care. She died at the age of 21.

In addition to her native English, Triggs speaks some French.

References

External links

Emeritus Professor Gillian Triggs - University of Sydney
Professor Gillian Triggs - Australian Human Rights Commission

1945 births
Living people
Australian women academics
Academic staff of the University of Melbourne
Melbourne Law School alumni
Lawyers from Melbourne
Lawyers from Sydney
Southern Methodist University alumni
English emigrants to Australia